A200 is a motorway in the Netherlands.

Exit list

References

Motorways in the Netherlands
Motorways in North Holland
Haarlem
Haarlemmermeer